Dominique Le Dissès (born Laval on 29 August 1957 at Urzy) is a former French athlete, who specialized in the 400 meters hurdles.

Biography  
She won five French championship titles for the 400m hurdles in 1979, 1980, 1981, 1983 and 1984.

Prize list  
 French Championships in Athletics   :  
 5 times winner of the 400m hurdles in 1979,  1980,  1981,  1983 and 1984.

Records

Notes and references  
 Docathlé2003, Fédération française d'athlétisme, 2003, p. 414

1957 births
Living people
French female hurdlers